Open Your Eyes You Can Fly is the fifth solo studio album by Brazilian jazz singer Flora Purim. It was released in 1976 via Milestone Records. Recording sessions for the album took place at Paramount Recording Studios in Los Angeles, California. The album features contributions from Airto Moreira on percussion and vocals, David Amaro and Egberto Gismonti on guitars, George Duke on keyboards, Hermeto Pascoal on electric piano and flute, Alphonso Johnson and Ron Carter on bass, Robertinho Silva and Leon "Ndugu" Chancler on drums, and Laudir de Oliveira on congas. One of the songs featured here, Sometime Ago, was composed by Chick Corea with lyrics by Neville Potter and was featured on the eponymous album by Return to Forever produced in 1972, Flora Purim and her husband Airto Guimorvan Moreira also played on that album.

The album peaked at number 59 on the Billboard 200 albums chart and at number 38 on the Top R&B/Hip-Hop Albums chart in the United States. Its title track, a cover version of the Chick Corea/Neville Potter song "Open Your Eyes, You Can Fly", was released as the only album's single.

Track listing 

 Notes
 Track 1 is a cover of "Open Your Eyes, You Can Fly", which was performed in 1973 by Gary Burton from The New Quartet
 Track 3 is a cover of "Sometime Ago/La Fiesta", which was performed in 1972 by Chick Corea from Return to Forever

Personnel 
 Flora Purim – vocals
 Airto Guimorvan Moreira – vocals (tracks: 5, 8), congas (track 5), drums (tracks: 7, 8), berimbau (track 8), percussion
 David Amaro – backing vocals (track 1), electric guitar (tracks: 1, 3–7), acoustic guitar (track 2), acoustic 12-string guitar (track 8)
 George Duke – backing vocals (track 1), electric piano (tracks: 1–3, 6), Moog synthesizer (tracks: 4–7), ARP String Ensemble (tracks: 2, 3, 6, 7), clavinet (track 5), ARP Odyssey (track 6)
 Hermeto Pascoal – backing vocals (track 1), flute (tracks: 1–5, 8), electric piano (tracks: 4–8), harpsichord & percussion (track 8)
 Egberto Amin Gismonti – acoustic guitar (tracks: 4, 8)
 Alphonso Johnson – electric bass (tracks: 1–6, 8), acoustic bass (tracks: 2, 6, 7)
 Ron Carter – acoustic bass (tracks: 4, 8)
 Robertinho Silva – drums (tracks: 4–6), berimbau (tracks: 5, 8), percussion (tracks: 6, 8)
 Leon "Ndugu" Chancler – drums (tracks: 1–3)
 Laudir de Oliveira – congas (tracks: 3, 6)
 Orrin Keepnews – producer, sleeve notes
 Kerry McNabb – engineering
 John Golden – mastering
 Jimmy Wachtel – art direction
 Lorrie Sullivan – photography
 Bruce W. Talamon – photograph

Chart history

References

External links 

Flora's Recordings on her website
Open Your Eyes You Can Fly by Flora Purim on iTunes

1976 albums
Flora Purim albums
Milestone Records albums
Albums produced by Orrin Keepnews